"Another Time, Another Place" is a song by Engelbert Humperdinck, the title track of his 1971 LP.  It became an international hit, reaching No. 13 in the United Kingdom and No. 16 in Canada.

Background
The song was written by Mike Leander & Eddie Seago. It was an unsuccessful entrant in a concert, but it would later find success with Engelbert Humperdinck. It was released in the UK on Decca (F 13212) in August 1971, and in the US on Parrot (45-40065).

Chart performance
In late 1971, the song peaked at No. 43 in the US. It also made No. 5 on the US Adult Contemporary chart. For the week ending November 27, 1971, Billboard recorded its chart positions at No. 10 in Belgium, No. 2 in Malaysia and No. 2 in Singapore.

References

External links
 

1971 singles
1971 songs
Engelbert Humperdinck songs
Songs written by Mike Leander
Songs written by Eddie Seago
Decca Records singles